This article provides details of international football games played by the El Salvador national football team from 1961 to 1969.

1961

1963

1965

1966

1967

1968

1969

References 

El Salvador national football team